Pajas Blancas is a village of Montevideo Department in Uruguay.

Population
In 2004, Pajas Blancas had 1,976 inhabitants.

Source: Instituto Nacional de Estadística de Uruguay

References

Populated places in the Montevideo Department